The seventh series of Acapulco Shore, a Mexican television programme based in Acapulco was confirmed on 19 February 2020. It was filmed in February and March. The show began on 2 June 2020. This is the first series to include new cast members Fernanda Moreno, Ignacia Michelson, Isabel Castro, José Arana and Ramiro Giménez. This series marks the return of Talía Loaiza as main cast member, who leaves at the end of the previous series. Ahead of the series it was confirmed that the series would be filmed in a Mexican seaside town Mazatlán. 

In the 10th episode, Dania Méndez made an off-camera outing, then came back and announced her departure from the show. Fernanda was expelled by some of her companions from the house. This was the final series to include cast member original Luis Caballero, Luis Méndez, Manelyk González, Tadeo Fernández and Talía Loaiza, as well as Rocío Sánchez and Xavier Meade.

Cast 

 Dania Méndez (Episodes 1–11)
 Eduardo "Chile" Miranda
 Fernanda Moreno (Episodes 3–17)
 Ignacia "Nacha" Michelson
 Isabel Castro (Episodes 12–17)
 Jibranne "Jey" Bazán
 José "Pepe" Aran (Episodes 4–17)
 Karime Pindter
 Luis "Jawy" Méndez
 Luis "Potro" Caballero
 Manelyk González
 Tadeo Fernández
 Talía Loaiza (Episodes 15–17)
 Ramiro Giménez (Episodes 10–17)
 Rocío Sánchez
 Xavier Meade

Duration of cast 

 = Cast member is featured in this episode.
 = Cast member arrives in the house.
 = Cast member voluntarily leaves the house.
 = Cast member is removed from the house.
 = Cast member leaves and returns to the house in the same episode.
 = Cast member returns to the house.
 = Cast member leaves the series.
 = Cast member returns to the series.
 = Cast member features in this episode, but is outside of the house.
 = Cast member does not feature in this episode.
 = "Cast member" is not a cast member in this episode.

Episodes

Controversy, censorship and gender violence 
The violence unleashed throughout the season was criticized for an incident in which a male participant assaulted a woman. For this reason, MTV decided to censor a large part of the scenes in which the cast members were in situations of physical violence.

On June 2, 2020 during the season premiere, in the middle of a physical altercation between Manelyk González and Dania Méndez, the latter was attacked by her co-star Luis Méndez, who in an attempt to end the confrontation between her partner and Dania, he rested his elbow on his Dania face for several seconds. Minutes later in the broadcast of the spin-off program Estudio Shore, Luis said: “I wanted to separate Dania from my girlfriend (Manelyk), what if I separated her and put my elbow on her? Yes I did and one and a million times more ", this caused a wave of claims on social networks, such a scene was edited in future reruns. On June 4, Luis Méndez published a statement on his Instagram in which he apologized for what happened.

Following the airing of the second episode on June 9, 2020, criticism now continues due to censorship. MTV Latin America decided not to broadcast a confrontation between Dania, Ignacia Michelson, Manelyk González and presumably Rocío Sánchez. Part of the censored scene could be seen as the closing of the first episode like the preview of "Next Week". The full showdown was leaked in April 2021.

On July 21, during the eighth episode, after a heated argument, Dania threw glass objects at Manelyk, an action that was deemed "dangerous" by both the production and the housemates. Later in an interview, Dania revealed that both she and Manelyk received a warning from the production.

Following Dania's departure on August 11 during the tenth episode, an off-camera outing as it was not televised, rumors spread that another altercation had broken out. Finally, in an interview with Gerardo Escareño from VayaVayaTV, Dania revealed that Luis Méndez had pushed her, an action that caused her to partially leave the program before permanently leaving the program on August 18, 2020.

References 

Mexican reality television series
2020 Mexican television seasons